Royal Unibrew is a brewing and beverage company headquartered in Faxe, Denmark. Its brands include Ceres, Faxe, Albani, Thor,
Karlens and Royal. Royal Unibrew also has a strong presence in the Baltic region, where it owns Vilniaus Tauras, Kalnapilis (both in Lithuania), and Lāčplēša Alus (in Latvia). As of 2018 it owns the brewery in France that produces the Lorina soft drink brand. It also brews and markets Heineken in Denmark.

History
The company was founded in 1989 through the merger of the breweries Faxe, Ceres and Thor under the name Bryggerigruppen. Odense-based Albani merged with the company in 2000. In 2005, the name of the company was changed to Royal Unibrew.

Operations

Denmark
Royal Unibrew is the second largest beer company in Denmark with a market share of about 25%.

Baltic countries and Poland
Royal Unibrew acquired Lithuanian breweries Vilniaus Tauras and Kalnapilis in 2001 and a controlling interest in Latvian brewery Lāčplēša Alus in 2004. The company also owns the Latvian soft drink company Cido and Tanker Brewery in Estonia.

Royal Unibrew entered the Polish beer market with the acquisition of Browary Polskie Brok-Strzelec S.A. in April 2005.
It was followed by the acquisition of Browar Łomża in 2007. In December 2010, Van Pur Breweries bought the Polish branch of the Danish Royal Unibrew group. In exchange, Royal Unibrew received 20% of shares of Van Pur in Poland with Van Pur retaining buyers options of the shares. In 2011 Van Pur, owned five breweries with the total production capacity of 4 million hectolitre of beer annually. October 15, 2012 Van Pur exercised its buyers option on the 20% shares previously held by Royal Unibrew for 111 PLN.

France
In 2018 the soft drink brewery that produces the brand Lorina was acquired.

List of subsidiaries

Royal Brand
The largest brand of Unibrew is Royal. It is based on Ceres' Ceres Royal Export and Faxe's Faxe Pilsner/Classic. Royal Export was also brewed by the other breweries in the group, but later the Pilsner and Classic were added to make a complete family of beer as is traditional in Denmark.

See also
Beer in Denmark

References

External links

 Royal Unibrew corporate website.

 
Breweries in Denmark
Companies based in Faxe Municipality
Purveyors to the Court of Denmark
Danish companies established in 1989